Study Butte is a census-designated place (CDP) in Brewster County, Texas, United States. The population was 233 at the 2010 census. At the 2000 census, the area was part of the Study Butte-Terlingua CDP.

Geography
The Terlingua CDP borders Study Butte to the southwest.

Climate
This area has a large amount of sunshine year round due to its stable descending air and high pressure.  According to the Köppen Climate Classification system, Study Butte-Terlingua has a desert climate, abbreviated "BWh" on climate maps.
Coordinates: 
Elevation:

Demographics

Education
Study Butte is served by the Terlingua Common School District. Big Bend High School is the local school. Prior to fall 1996 students at the high school level attended Alpine High School in the Alpine Independent School District. Previously the Terlingua CSD had Big Bend High and Terlingua Elementary as separate schools.

References

External links
 Study Butte in Handbook of Texas

Census-designated places in Brewster County, Texas
Census-designated places in Texas